Crime City may refer to:

Games
Crime City, a game for the Atari ST and Commodore Amiga
Crime City, a 1989 arcade video game
Crime City, a 1992 video game by Impressions Games
Crime Cities, a 2000 video game
CSI: Crime City, a 2010 video game
Gangstar: Crime City, a 2006 open-world action-adventure video game
MicroMacro: Crime City, a board game published in 2020

Film
New Crime City, a 1994 film
Whispering City, a 1947 Canadian film also known as Crime City
Crime City (film series), South Korean crime action film series
The Outlaws (2017 film), first film in the series with literal title Crime City
The Roundup (2022 film), second film in the series with literal title Crime City 2
The Roundup: No Way Out, upcoming third film in the series with literal title Crime City 3

Other
Crime City Rollers, a women's flat track roller derby league based in Malmö, Sweden

See also
Crime & the City Solution